"Pretty Fly (for a White Guy)" is a song by American punk-rock band the Offspring. It is the fourth track from the band's fifth studio album, Americana (1998), and was released as its first single in November 1998. The song peaked at number 53 on the US Billboard Hot 100, number five on the Billboard Mainstream Rock Tracks chart, and number three on the Billboard Modern Rock Tracks chart. It was successful internationally, reaching number one in 10 countries, including Australia, where it stayed at number one for six weeks and was certified quadruple platinum.

The song appears as the seventh track on the Offspring's 2005 Greatest Hits album. It was parodied by Weird Al Yankovic in "Pretty Fly for a Rabbi".

Composition and lyrics
Beginning with a sample of the pseudo-German nonsense phrase "Gunter glieben glauchen globen" from Def Leppard's 1983 song "Rock of Ages", chanted as a replacement for the traditional "1, 2, 3, 4" to start the recording, the song ridicules a "wannabe gangsta" who is immersed in hip-hop culture, not because he truly loves or understands it but because it is trendy, makes him feel tough ("Friends say he's tryin' too hard, and he's not quite hip/But in his own mind, he's the, he's the dopest trip") and because he believes it attracts women ("and all the girlies say I'm pretty fly, for a white guy"). The “Give it to me baby” verse was done by voice actress Nika Futterman.

As summed up by Dexter Holland, the people described in the lyrics "are from, like, Omaha, Nebraska, regular white-bread boys, but who act like they're from Compton. It's so fake and obvious that they're trying to have an identity." Holland detailed that he meets many teenagers like those in his native Orange County, "going to the mall, where they buy FUBU, Tommy Hilfiger, and Ice Cube's latest record." Given rap culture is the starting point, Holland clarified that it was not an attack on African-Americans, but "poseurs of any kind", but without wanting "to be preachy about it... We're getting amusement out of it more than anything else."

Critical reception
Daily Record commented that on "Pretty Fly (for a White Guy)", the band "has obviously been inspired by early-Beastie Boys and Run DMC songs."

Music video
The music video for the song, directed by McG, begins with the "white guy" and some girls singing the opening lines, and Offspring guitarist Noodles walking on the pavement with his guitar, playing the introductory riff. The "white guy" drives through town in his lowrider and tries to act cool in front of African-Americans, playing with his car's hydraulic system and interrupting a break dance session to dance himself. He is then carried by a group of girls to a pool party and thrown into the pool. He jumps out of the pool and finds some bikini clad dancers in front of him. These scenes are cut with the band playing. The video ends with the "white guy" returning home and scaring his little sister, who is wearing a fairy costume, because of his dishevelled appearance.

According to Dexter Holland, the band wanted Seth Green to play the "white guy" but he was unavailable. After seeing an audition tape with "five unknowns", they settled on Israeli actor Guy Cohen, who went on to cameo in the "Why Don't You Get a Job?" video and occasionally appear at Offspring concerts.

Track listings
US promo CD

US 7-inch vinyl and UK cassette single

Australian CD single

UK CD single 1

UK CD single 2

Italian 12-inch vinyl

DVD appearances
The music video also appears on the Complete Music Video Collection DVD. It was released in 2005. The DVD also contains a storyboard version of the video, in which the storyboard plays over top of the music video.

Charts

Weekly charts

Year-end charts

Certifications

Release history

Legacy
 The song was used in the Close Enough episode The Weird Kid.
 The song was parodied by "Weird Al" Yankovic as "Pretty Fly for a Rabbi".

References

Songs about white people
The Offspring songs
1998 singles
1998 songs
Comedy rock songs
Satirical songs
Dutch Top 40 number-one singles
Irish Singles Chart number-one singles
Macaronic songs
Music videos directed by McG
Number-one singles in Australia
Number-one singles in Finland
Number-one singles in Greece
Number-one singles in Italy
Number-one singles in Norway
Number-one singles in Scotland
Number-one singles in Sweden
Songs written by Dexter Holland
Songs written by Joe Elliott
Songs written by Robert John "Mutt" Lange
Songs written by Steve Clark
UK Singles Chart number-one singles
Ultratop 50 Singles (Flanders) number-one singles